Nicole Provis and Elizabeth Smylie were the defending champions but were defeated in the quarterfinals by Jo-Anne Faull and Julie Richardson.

Lori McNeil and Rennae Stubbs won in the final against Sandy Collins and Elna Reinach, 5–7, 6–3, 8–6.

Seeds
Champion seeds are indicated in bold text while text in italics indicates the round in which those seeds were eliminated. The top four seeded teams received byes into the second round.

Draw

Finals

Top half

Bottom half

External links
 1992 Dow Classic Draws

Birmingham Classic (tennis)
1992 WTA Tour